Lineliai is a village in Kėdainiai district municipality, in Kaunas County, in central Lithuania. According to the 2011 census, the village was uninhabited.

It was established in the lands of Mladochovo folwark.

Demography

References

Villages in Kaunas County
Kėdainiai District Municipality